Chałupki  is a village in the administrative district of Gmina Rudnik nad Sanem, within Nisko County, Subcarpathian Voivodeship, in south-eastern Poland.

The village has a population of 316.

References

Villages in Nisko County